Divide is an unincorporated community in Jefferson County, in the U.S. state of Illinois.

History
A post office was established at Divide in 1879, and remained in operation until 1905. The community most likely was so named on account of its location near a drainage divide.

References

Unincorporated communities in Jefferson County, Illinois
Unincorporated communities in Illinois